Dartford Borough Council is the local authority for the Borough of Dartford in Kent, England. The council is elected every four years.

Political control
The first election to the council was held in 1973, initially operating as a shadow authority before coming into its powers on 1 April 1974. Political control of the council since 1973 has been held by the following parties:

Leadership
The leaders of the council since 1998 have been:

Council elections
1973 Dartford District Council election
1976 Dartford Borough Council election (New ward boundaries)
1979 Dartford Borough Council election
1983 Dartford Borough Council election
1987 Dartford Borough Council election (Some new ward boundaries & borough boundary changes also took place)
1991 Dartford Borough Council election
1995 Dartford Borough Council election (Borough boundary changes took place but the number of seats remained the same)
1999 Dartford Borough Council election
2003 Dartford Borough Council election (New ward boundaries)
2007 Dartford Borough Council election
2011 Dartford Borough Council election
2015 Dartford Borough Council election
2019 Dartford Borough Council election

By-election results

1995-1999

1999-2003

2003-2007

This election was scheduled as part of the council elections of 1 May 2003. It was delayed following the death of Bob Dunn (who was standing for re-election), just one week before the ballot.

2011-2015

The by-election was held following the resignation of Conservative Cllr Gary Reynolds.

The by-election resulted from the death of Swanscombe and Greenhithe Residents Association Cllr Leslie Bobby.

The by-election was held following the resignation of Labour Cllr John Adams.

The by-election was held following the death of Conservative Cllr Nancy Wightman.

The by-election was held following the death of Labour Cllr John Muckle.

2019-2023

The by-election was held following the resignation of Conservative Cllr Ian Armitt.

The by-election was held following the resignation of Conservative Cllr Calvin McLean.

The by-election was held following the death of Conservative Cllr Ann Allen.

The by-election was held following the resignation of Conservative Cllr Lucas Reynolds.

References

External links
 Dartford Borough Council

 
Borough of Dartford
Council elections in Kent
District council elections in England